Doris marmorata is a species of sea slug, a dorid nudibranch, a marine gastropod mollusc in the family Dorididae.

Distribution
This species was described from shallow water, beneath rocks covered with algae and sessile invertebrates at Nice, France.

References

Dorididae
Gastropods described in 1818